Nabatieh was a Palestinian refugee camp in southern Lebanon, most of the population was moved to Ein el-Helweh.

In May and June 1974, the Israeli Air Force bombed the camp and much of the camp was turned to rubble and its population dispersed.

The 1974 film They Do Not Exist by Palestinian filmmaker Mustafa Abu Ali documents the destruction of Nabatieh refugee camp.

See also
Palestinian refugee camps

External links and references

https://www.un.org/unrwa/refugees/lebanon.html
http://domino.un.org/unispal.nsf/0/9b371b1e35e5b30985256866006a88ec?OpenDocument
They Do Not Exist - Film by Mustafa Abu Ali

Palestinian refugee camps in Lebanon